Fritz Spielmann (26 March 1933 – 22 July 2009) was an Austrian ice hockey player. He competed in the men's tournaments at the 1956 Winter Olympics and the 1964 Winter Olympics.

References

1933 births
2009 deaths
Olympic ice hockey players of Austria
Ice hockey players at the 1956 Winter Olympics
Ice hockey players at the 1964 Winter Olympics
Sportspeople from Innsbruck